Rolf Kleinert (24 November 1911 – 20 January 1975) was a German conductor.

Life and work
Born in Dresden, Kleinert, the son of a porcelain maker, studied violin, piano at the orchestral school of the Saxon Staatskapelle Dresden from 1931 to 1933 and conducting with Fritz Busch. Other teachers were Kurt Striegler, Hermann Ludwig Kutzschbach and Johannes Schneider-Marfels. He also played the oboe and trumpet. He first worked as a bandmaster at the Freiberg Theatre and as musical director and conductor of the symphony concerts at the Brandenburg/H Stadttheater. In 1941, Kleinert had to interrupt his career because he was drafted into the Wehrmacht. At the end of the war, he was taken prisoner in France. From 1947 to 1949, he conducted the MDR Symphony Orchestra at the Leipzig radio station. The German Democratic Republic first performance of the Polish national opera Halka was initiated and performed by him.

In 1952, he began a long-standing collaboration with the Rundfunk-Sinfonieorchester Berlin. First as 1st conductor alongside the chief conductor Hermann Abendroth. After his death in 1956, Kleinert led the orchestra. In 1959, Kleinert was appointed General Music Director in the GDR and took over as chief conductor of the Berlin Radio Symphony Orchestra. In 1960, he received the title of professor. Due to the construction of the Berlin Wall in 1961, the orchestra lost a third of its musicians. The orchestra was on the verge of disbanding. Kleinert and Hanns Eisler fought vehemently for the orchestra's existence. Through his intensive commitment in the search for suitable musicians, he succeeded in making the orchestra playable again and preserving its specific sound. Concert tours with the orchestra took Kleinert to Italy, England, West Germany, the Soviet Union, Poland and Bulgaria. He was repeatedly invited by the National Orchestra of Chile, the Philharmonic Orchestras of Belgrade, Leningrad (Petersburg), Moscow, the Czech Republic, Riga, Budapest, Bratislava, Cairo and the RSO Helsinki to guest conduct.

Kleinert received the Patriotic Order of Merit and the National Prize of the German Democratic Republic.

In 1972, Kleinert fell ill and had to give up conducting.

There are about 800 recordings conducted by him in the Deutsches Rundfunkarchiv conducted by him.

Significance 
"Kleinert was a conductor of the 'true to the works' school, coming from the tradition of Leibowitz, Toscanini and Scherchen. He knew how to elicit tempo, accuracy, clarity and dancing elegance from every score." Dr. M. Meyer, in Rundfunk Sinfonieorchester 1923-1998. An excellent percussion technique, a great sense of sound and an absolute ear were Kleinert's essential qualities.

Recordings (selection) 
 Beethoven: Konzert für Klavier und Orchester Nr. 2 B-Dur, op.19, Sol. D.Zechlin/RSOB 1965
 Beethoven: Sinfonie Nr. 7 A-Dur, op.92/RSOB 1965
 Brahms: Konzert für Violine, Violoncello und Orchester, a-Moll, op.102 Sol.Garay, Aldulescu/RSOB 1966
 Paul Dessau: Sinfonie No. 2 (1943)/RSOB 1962
 Dessau: Bach-Variation/RSOB 1970
 Edward Elgar: Enigma-Variations op.36/RSOB 1971
 Fritz Geißler: Kammersinfonie „45“/RSOB 1968
 Ottmar Gerster: Konzert für Klavier und Orchester, Sol.S, Stöckigt/RSOB 1959
 Paul Hindemith: Philharmonisches Konzert (Variationen für Orchester 1932)/RSOB 1968
 Rolf Liebermann: Concerto für Jazzband und Sinfonieorchester/RSOB u. Tanzorchester des Berliner Rundfunk 1966
 Witold Lutosławski: Konzert für Orchester/RSOB 1967
 Étienne-Nicolas Méhul: Sinfonie Nr. 1/ RSOB 1954
 Shostakovich: Concerto in C minor for Piano, Trumpet, and String Orchestra op.35/S. Kootz, Krug/RSOB
 Schumann: Symphony No. 3 (Rhenish) RSOB 1971
 Leo Spies: Violin Concerto (1953) Sol.E.Morbitzer/RSOB 1955

References

Further reading 
  Berlin (ed.): Rundfunk Sinfonieorchester 1923–1998. Berlin 1998
 Meyers Neues Lexikon, vol. 7. VEB Bibliographisches Institut Leipzig, 1973
 Landesverwaltungsamt Berlin

External links 
 
 
 Elektry (in German) Rundfunkschätze / Dresdner und Leipziger Sternstunden aus Oper und Konzert
 Christian Quinque: Musik für eine humanistischere Gesellschaft (thesis, in German)
 Fritz Geißler (1921–1984) / Chamber Symphony (1954) Breitkopf

German conductors (music)
Recipients of the Patriotic Order of Merit in silver
Recipients of the National Prize of East Germany
1911 births
1975 deaths
Musicians from Dresden
German prisoners of war in World War II